Erik Gustafsson may refer to:

Erik Gustafsson (ice hockey, born 1988), Swedish ice hockey defenceman playing for Luleå HF
Erik Gustafsson (ice hockey, born 1992), Swedish ice hockey defenceman playing for the Toronto Maple Leafs
Erik Gustafsson (musician), past bass guitarist for Therion
Erik Gustafsson (sprinter) (born 1943), Finnish Olympic sprinter

See also
Nils-Eric Gustafsson (1922–2017), Swedish Centre Party politician
Erik Gustafson (disambiguation)
Eric Gustafson (disambiguation)